Michael Eugene Couchee (born December 4, 1957, in San Jose, California) is a former relief pitcher in Major League Baseball and a current minor league pitching coach with the San Jose Giants.

Couchee was selected three times in baseball's amateur draft, but chose to attend college rather than sign on the first two occasions. He was chosen by the San Francisco Giants in 1976, the Minnesota Twins in 1978, and the San Diego Padres in 1980. He eventually appeared in only 8 games in relief for the Padres, all in 1983. He had an 0–1 record with a 5.14 ERA.
After his playing career ended, Couchee took up coaching, beginning with the Texas Rangers organization in 1986. He then spent 15 years as a coach with the California Angels organization, including a brief stint as the team's bullpen coach in 1996 after Manager Marcel Lachemann quit. In 2003, Couchee rejoined the Padres as a pitching coach for their Class AAA Portland Beavers. He spent eight years as the San Diego Padres Minor League Pitching Coordinator from 2004 to 2011. Couchee was the pitching coach for the San Francisco Giants' Arizona Rookie League club in 2012 and was named the pitching coach for the Giants' Single A team – the San Jose Giants – in 2013.

Couchee, a 1976 graduate of Los Gatos High School in Los Gatos, California, quarterbacked the high school football team (the Wildcats) to the first undefeated season in the school's history. He also was a star pitcher for the school's baseball team. In 1980, Couchee received The President's Award as Most Valuable Player at the University of Southern California.

Notes

References 
 "Couchee is a star in football and a superstar in baseball" by the Los Gatos Weekly Times, March 16, 2005.
 "Skeels Returns As Manager; New Faces Fill Remainder of Coaching Staff"

External links

1957 births
Living people
Major League Baseball pitchers
San Diego Padres players
Hawaii Islanders players
San Jose City Jaguars baseball players
USC Trojans baseball players
Baseball players from San Jose, California
California Angels coaches
Major League Baseball pitching coaches
Minor league baseball coaches
Reno Silver Sox players
Grays Harbor Loggers players
Amarillo Gold Sox players
Las Vegas Stars (baseball) players
Beaumont Golden Gators players
Rochester Red Wings players
Tulsa Drillers players
Charlotte O's players
Anchorage Glacier Pilots players
Alaska Goldpanners of Fairbanks players